Muttonbird or mutton bird may refer to species of petrel, especially shearwaters, whose young are harvested for food and other uses before they fledge in Australia and New Zealand. The English term "muttonbird" originally emerged among settlers on Norfolk Island as the strong taste and fattiness of these birds' meat was likened to mutton. The Māori name for the birds, tītī, is also widely used in New Zealand.

Species of bird
 Short-tailed shearwater, nesting in south-eastern Australia, particularly in the Furneaux Islands
 Sooty shearwater, nesting mainly in New Zealand and islands in the South Atlantic Ocean
 Wedge-tailed shearwater, nesting throughout the tropical and subtropical parts of the Indian and Pacific Oceans
 Flesh-footed shearwater, nesting on Lord Howe Island

Places
 Mutton Bird Island, Tasmania, Australia
 South East Mutton Bird Islet
 South West Mutton Bird Islet
 Titi/Muttonbird Islands, New Zealand

Music
 The Mutton Birds, band from Auckland
 The Mutton Birds (album)

See also
Muttonbirding, the capturing of muttonbird fledglings

Animal common name disambiguation pages